= Jerusalem 24 =

Hebrew radio station in Palestine

- Ramallah; Palestine
- Branding: J24 106.1 The People's Voice

Programming
- Languages: English, Hebrew
- Format: News

Ownership
- Owner: Afkar Productions Company

Links
- Webcast: Listen Live
- Website: jerusalem.24fm.ps

Jerusalem 24 is a Hebrew-language radio station broadcast from Ramallah, Palestine. The station was founded in September 2021 with a focus on the Israel-Palestine conflict, particularly to share the perspective of Palestinian society with the broader Israeli public. The station was launched in 2021 with funding from Danish NGO Church Aid.

Jerusalem 24 criticizes both the Israeli government and the Palestinian Authority. According to Jerusalem 24 journalist Mohammed Hamayel, the criticism is done "professionally".
